Shatrov is a surname. Notable people with the surname include: 

Ilya Shatrov (1879 (or 1885)–1952), Russian military musician, conductor, and composer
Mikhail Shatrov (1932–2010), Soviet playwright